Diphthine synthase is an enzyme that in humans is encoded by the DPH5 gene.

This gene encodes a component of the diphthamide synthesis pathway. Diphthamide is a post-translationally modified histidine residue found only on translation elongation factor 2. It is conserved from archaebacteria to humans, and is targeted by diphtheria toxin and Pseudomonas exotoxin A to halt cellular protein synthesis. 

The yeast and Chinese hamster homologs of this protein catalyze the trimethylation of the histidine residue on elongation factor 2, resulting in a diphthine moiety that is subsequently amidated to yield diphthamide. Multiple transcript variants encoding different isoforms have been found for this gene.

References

Further reading